Bromopentanes are a group of related chemical compounds which are brominated derivatives of pentane. There are three constitutional isomers which are distinguished by the location of the bromine atom:

 1-Bromopentane 
 2-Bromopentane
 3-Bromopentane

There can also be different connectivity between the 5 carbon atoms. So pentane can either have 5 carbons in a straight chain, or it can be branched. Pentane has two possible branched structures: 2-methylbutane ("isopentane") and 2,2-dimethylpropane ("neopentane").
 
For 2-methylbutane, the possibilities for combining with bromine are:

 1-bromo-2-methylbutane 
 2-bromo-2-methylbutane 
 2-bromo-3-methylbutane
 1-bromo-3-methylbutane

For 2,2-dimethylpropane, there is only one possible brominated derivative:

 1-bromo-2,2-dimethylpropane

See also
 Bromoalkanes
 Bromomethane
 Bromoethane
 Bromopropane (disambiguation)
 Bromobutane
 Bromohexane

References 

Bromoalkanes